Lionsgate UK (formerly Redbus Film Distribution, and briefly known as Helkon SK between 2001 and 2003) is the British subsidiary of the Canadian-American film company, Lionsgate.

Founded in 1997 by Simon Franks and Zygi Kamasa, the company have distributed and produced many films for the United Kingdom, such as Bend It Like Beckham, What's Cooking?,  Cabin Fever, Jeepers Creepers, It's All Gone Pete Tong and Good Night, and Good Luck. The first theatrical film released by Redbus was Open Your Eyes. Redbus's film releases were formerly distributed on home video by Warner Home Video.

The company was acquired by Lionsgate in October 2005.

History
Redbus Film Distribution was formed in 1999. According to an investment prospectus filed in March 1999, it was funded to the tune of £250,000, and took its name from, Cliff Stanford's Redbus Group SA.

The prospectus stated that its goals were toco-produce, and distribute...10-12 full length feature films annually to the cinema, video and television markets in the UK. 

On 6 May 2001, Redbus was acquired by the German media company Helkon Media AG for $23 million, and changed its name to Helkon SK, to reflect their partnership with Helkon Media, and then split from Helkon Media, and renamed it back to Redbus on 6 May 2003. On 17 October 2005, Lionsgate acquired Redbus Film Distribution for $35 million. and became Lionsgate UK on 23 February 2006.

Films

1997:
 Open Your Eyes
2000:
 What's Cooking?
2002:
 Cabin Fever
2005
 Good Night, and Good Luck
2007:
 Happily N'Ever After
2009:
 Happily N'Ever After 2
2010:
 Alpha and Omega2012:
 Salmon Fishing in the Yemen Silent Hill: Revelation2015:
 Brooklyn Smosh: The Movie2016:
 Eddie the Eagle Ratchet & Clank2017:
 Trespass Against Us Power Rangers The Limehouse Golem Jigsaw Where's The Money2018:
 Journey's End Sicaro: Day of the Soldado Kin Winchester2019:
 Missing Link The Queen's Corgi2021:
 Wrath of Man2023:
 Alice, Darling

References

External links
 

Film distributors of the United Kingdom
British companies established in 1997
Entertainment companies established in 1997
Lionsgate subsidiaries
2005 mergers and acquisitions
Mass media companies based in London
British subsidiaries of foreign companies